EV Carinae is a red supergiant and pulsating variable star of spectral type M4Ia in the constellation Carina. It is a semiregular variable star with its apparent magnitude varying between 7.4 and 9.0 in the visible band, making it only seen by binoculars or a telescope.  Various periods have been identified, but the dominant one is around 347 days.  It is an MK spectral standard star for the class M4.5Ia.

EV Car is one of the largest known stars although its properties depend on its distance. In the late of the 20th century, EV Carinae, based on an assumed distance of 4.2 kpc, was found to be an extremely luminous and large supergiant star with an unusual luminosity between 550,000 and 675,000 times that of the Sun, which would imply radii of 2,880 to 3,190 times the Sun's radius at a temperature of 2,930 K, making it larger than the orbit of Saturn.

References 

M-type supergiants
Semiregular variable stars
Carinae, EV
Carina (constellation)
CD-59 03024
089845
J10202160-6027155